This is a list of airports in New York (a U.S. state), grouped by type and sorted by location. It contains all public-use and military airports in the state. Some private-use and former airports may be included where notable, such as airports that were previously public-use, those with commercial enplanements recorded by the FAA or airports assigned an IATA airport code.

Airports

See also 
 New York World War II Army Airfields
 Aviation in the New York metropolitan area
 Essential Air Service

References 

Federal Aviation Administration (FAA):
 FAA Airport Data (Form 5010) from National Flight Data Center (NFDC), also available from AirportIQ 5010
 National Plan of Integrated Airport Systems (2017–2021), released September 2016
 Passenger Boarding (Enplanement) Data for CY 2016 (final), released October 2017

New York State Department of Transportation (NYSDOT):
 Office of Integrated Modal Services: Aviation Bureau
 New York State Airport Directory 2009–2010
 New York State Airport Directory 2001-2002

Other sites used as a reference when compiling and updating this list:
 Aviation Safety Network – used to check IATA airport codes
 Great Circle Mapper: Airports in New York – used to check IATA and ICAO airport codes
 Abandoned & Little-Known Airfields: New York State – used for information on former airports

 
Airports
New York
Airports